Dr. Grey Stafford is an animal trainer, zoologist, educator, and currently the Director of Conservation at the Wildlife World Zoo and Aquarium in Phoenix, Arizona. He is also a spokesperson for the zoo and aquarium industry and has been featured on nationally televised programs.

Grey is also the author of Zoomility: Keeper Tales of Training with Positive Reinforcement. His mentor, Jack Hanna, wrote the book's foreword.

Early years
Grey was raised in Cleveland, Ohio and began his animal training career as a marine mammal trainer at SeaWorld of Ohio under the auspices of acclaimed animal trainers Thad Lacinak and Ted Turner.

Education
He holds a PhD granted by the Department of Biological Sciences at Kent State University.

Career
Grey serves as the Director of Conservation at the Wildlife World Zoo and Aquarium in Phoenix and appears regularly as a guest animal expert on "Fox 10 Arizona Morning," Good Morning Arizona and Your Life A to Z. He is a zoo spokesperson and has helped feature animals on The Ellen DeGeneres Show, Late Show with David Letterman, The Tonight Show with Jay Leno, Larry King Live, Martha Stewart, Rosie O'Donnell, Good Morning America and Weekend Extra. He has also been featured on the Sci Fi Channel.

Professional Service
Stafford also serves on the editorial advisory board for the International Marine Animal Trainers Association (IMATA).

Commentator
Grey serves as an expert commentator regarding captive animal issues for national and international media outlets. On July 30, 2010 he was interviewed by CNN HLN concerning the fatal grizzly bear attacks in Montana.

In 2013, he was selected along with his colleague William Hurley IV to serve as a guest panelist for a critique of the controversial docudrama Blackfish (film) for CNN.

References

External links

Animal trainers
Kent State University alumni
Writers from Cleveland
American male writers